Terran Petteway (born October 8, 1992) is an American professional basketball player for Hapoel Eilat of the Israeli Basketball Premier League. He played college basketball for Texas Tech University and the University of Nebraska. Petteway led the Big Ten Conference in scoring during the 2013–14 season.

High school career
As a high school senior at Ball High School, Petteway was signed by Pat Knight, however Knight was fired on March 7, 2011 from his role as head coach of the Texas Tech Red Raiders basketball team before Petteway even suited up for the Red Raiders. Petteway elected to maintain his commitment to Texas Tech after Billy Gillispie was hired as the Red Raiders new head coach on March 20, 2011.

College career

Freshman year
As a true freshman at Texas Tech, Petteway saw action in 28 games and 10 of his 11 starts during the season came during Big 12 Conference play. Texas Tech finished their 2011–12 season with just eight total wins and a single conference win, which was the deciding factor in Petteway electing to transfer to a different institution.

Transfer to Nebraska
Petteway opted to sign with Tim Miles and the Nebraska Cornhuskers men's basketball program citing the previous relationship he had developed with Coach Miles during high school when Miles recruited him at Colorado State.

Sophomore year
After sitting out during the 2012–13 season, Petteway was named co-captain for the Cornhuskers. Petteway led the league in scoring, averaging 18.1 points per game, becoming the first Nebraska basketball player to lead the league in scoring since Andre Smith led the Big Eight Conference during the 1980–81 season. He also helped guide the Nebraska Cornhuskers men's basketball team to its first NCAA Men's Division I Basketball tournament appearance since 1998.

Junior year
Prior to the 2014–15 NCAA Division I men's basketball season, Petteway was named Preseason All-American first team selection by Bleacher Report. He was a second team selection by CBSSports.com and a third team selection by SB Nation, and USA Today.  He was also listed as a John R. Wooden Award Preseason Top 50 candidate.

In April 2015, Petteway declared for the NBA draft, forgoing his final year of college eligibility.

College statistics

|-
| style="text-align:left;"| 2011–12
| style="text-align:left;"| Texas Tech
| 28 || 11 || 13.1 || .368 || .300 || .462 || 2.0 || .7 || .2 || .2 || 3.1
|-
| style="text-align:left;"| 2013–14
| style="text-align:left;"| Nebraska
| 32 || 32 || 31.7 || .426 || .327 || .819 || 4.8 || 1.6 || .9 || .8 || 18.1
|-
| style="text-align:left;"| 2014–15
| style="text-align:left;"| Nebraska
| 31 || 31 || 35.0 || .396 || .313 || .711 || 4.9 || 2.8 || 1.1 || .9 || 18.2
|-

Professional career

After going undrafted in the 2015 NBA draft, Petteway joined the Atlanta Hawks for the 2015 NBA Summer League. On July 24, 2015, he signed with the Hawks. However, he was later waived by the Hawks on October 22 after appearing in three preseason games. On October 25, he signed with the Indiana Pacers, only to be waived by the team the following day. On October 29, he was acquired by the Fort Wayne Mad Ants of the NBA Development League as an affiliate player of the Pacers. On July 5, 2016, Petteway joined the Milwaukee Bucks for the 2016 NBA Summer League. 

On August 7, 2016, he signed with Pistoia of the Italian Lega Basket Serie A, beginning his European career. Petteway spent the 2017–18 season with the French club Nanterre 92 and also had a brief stint in Greece with PAOK Thessaloniki, before returning to Italy for Dinamo Sassari in 2018.

On July 28, 2019, Petteway re-joined Pistoia for a second stint. There, he averaged 16.3 points, 4.3 rebounds and 3.1 assists per game. 

On June 20, 2020, Petteway signed with Peristeri of the Greek Basket League. In 24 games during the 2020–21 campaign, he averaged 11.5 points, 2.7 rebounds, and 2.1 assists per contest. On July 26, 2021, he renewed his contract with the Greek club. In 26 games during the 2021–22 campaign, he averaged 11.6 points, 2.8 rebounds, 1.5 assists and 0.8 steals, playing around 26 minutes per contest.

On September 11, 2022, he signed with Hapoel Eilat of the Israeli Basketball Premier League.

Personal life
Petteway has two older brothers, Terrell and Tavoir, both whom played college basketball. His oldest brother, Terrell played college basketball for Lamar University and also played professionally in England for the Sheffield Sharks. His mother, Joetta, died on April 7, 2015 after a two and half year battle with follicular dendritic cell sarcoma at age 53, the same age her mother also died of cancer.

References

External links
Nebraska bio
Texas Tech bio
Sports-Reference.com profile

1992 births
Living people
American expatriate basketball people in France
American expatriate basketball people in Greece
American expatriate basketball people in Italy
American men's basketball players
Basketball players from Texas
Dinamo Sassari players
Fort Wayne Mad Ants players
Hapoel Eilat basketball players
Lega Basket Serie A players
Nanterre 92 players
Nebraska Cornhuskers men's basketball players
P.A.O.K. BC players
Peristeri B.C. players
Pistoia Basket 2000 players
Shooting guards
Small forwards
Sportspeople from Galveston, Texas
Texas Tech Red Raiders basketball players